Trajectory Inc. is an American technology company that focuses on solving the problems facing the global book publishing market. It was founded by Jim Bryant in 2011 and is headquartered in Marblehead, Massachusetts.

The company is known for pioneering the development of a series of deep learning algorithms that are used to analyze and recommend books.

History 

Since its founding in 2011 by Jim Bryant, Trajectory established relationships with over 300 eBook distributors located on six continents. In 2013, the company quietly acquired the assets of startup Small Demons, which gave them access to the HarperCollins’ e-book library for analysis and data extraction. Trajectory went on to establish other partnerships with major publishers, thus growing its algorithms’ ability for book recommendation.

In 2014, the company invented a standardized way to compare and contrast the flow of sentiment through works of fiction.

In January 2015, Trajectory announced that it had invented a method to generate book recommendations based on the content of the book. It is believed to be the first company to successfully demonstrate this.

The company is also noted for its penetration in the Chinese e-book distribution market, where most notably it formed a pact with Tencent Literature in March 2015 to distribute over 200,000 Chinese titles in North and South American distribution channels and English titles across the Chinese company's customer base of 820 million active users. Also in the spring, Trajectory announced agreements with Chinese distributors Xiaomi and Dangdang.

In 2015, Trajectory announced agreements with Peoples Education Press, Zhejiang, Anhui, Diamond Comic Distributors, Gardners, the Association of American University Presses and others. In September of the same year, the company won the Book Industry Study Group's Industry Innovation Award for their re-imagination of and unique approach to the industry.

Customers 

Trajectory works within both the publishing and distributing sectors of the e-book market and has announced relationships with a broad range of major participants in the global book supply chain.

Publishers 

Among its clients, Trajectory's publisher partners include including, Macmillan, Abrams, MIT Press, Peoples Education Press, Anhui, Zhejiang.

Distributors 

Trajectory's distributor partners include: Tencent Literature, Xiaomi, Dangdang, Amazon, Apple, Barnes & Noble, Kobo, Google and over 300 other partners.

Natural Language Processing and Machine Learning 

In order to improve discoverability for books in publishing and distribution channels, Trajectory uses Natural Language Processing (NLP) and implements “Deep Learning” techniques that were the first of their kind to recommend books based on proprietary algorithms. These algorithms parse the text of the book and categorize data based on certain features like sentiment, parts of speech, genre, and keywords, and match it to the previously processed books in their database to generate suggestions. This content analysis contrasts current recommendation methods used by major companies like Amazon or Netflix that are powered by sales data and user reports. As the Natural Language Processing Engine parses more and more books in English, Chinese, Spanish, and German, the algorithms recommending capabilities improve transliterally.

References

External links

Book selling websites
Bookstores of the United States
Companies based in Marblehead, Massachusetts
Technology companies established in 2011
Ebook sources
Ebook suppliers
Electronic publishing
Internet properties established in 2011
Online retailers of the United States
Publishing companies established in 2011
Self-publishing companies
American companies established in 2011
Retail companies established in 2011